The following people were born, or live in, Palm Beach, Florida:

Actors and actresses
 Ellen Barkin – actress
 George Hamilton – actor
 Margaret Hayes – actress
 Mary Hartline – actress and model
 Brett King – actor who later opened Coral Sands Hotel in the Bahamas, died in Palm Beach in 1999
 Alexander Kirkland – actor
 Dina Merrill – American actress and socialite (daughter of E.F. Hutton & Marjorie Merriweather Post)
 Mark Patton – 1980s television and film actor
 Stephanie Seymour – model and actress
 Sylvester Stallone - actor
 Mary Woronov – actress

Authors
 Ted Bell – bestselling author of suspense and espionage novels
 William S. Burroughs, Jr. – American novelist, son of beat writer William S. Burroughs and great-grandson to William Seward Burroughs I, the original inventor of the Burroughs adding machine. (b. 1947)
 Ann Coulter – syndicated columnist, author, and political commentator
 Laurence Leamer – writer 
 Dmitri Nabokov – son and literary heir of famed novelist Vladimir Nabokov
 Tony Nader – author and leader of the Transcendental Meditation movement
 James Patterson – best selling author
 Richard René Silvin – author and lecturer

Businesspersons
 S. Daniel Abraham – creator of Slim Fast
 Barney Family – heirs to the Smith Barney banking and brokerage fortune
 Dan Borislow – founder of magicJack
 John K. Castle – chairman and CEO of Castle Harlan, Inc.
 James H. Clark – founder of Netscape
 Horace Dodge – Dodge automotive family and died December 1920 at his Palm Beach residence
 Jeffrey Epstein – financier and convicted sex offender
 Malcolm Glazer – CEO of First Allied Corporation and sports team owner (Manchester United of the Premier League and the Tampa Bay Buccaneers of the National Football League)
 Jane Goldman – real estate investor and daughter of Sol Goldman
 E.F. Hutton – Wall Street broker who built Mar-a-Lago, husband of Marjorie Merriweather Post
 Raymond Kassar – investor and former Chairman and CEO of Atari and former Vice-Chair of Burlington Industries
 John Kluge – Chairman of Metromedia, estimated net worth is $11 billion 
 David Koch – Vice president of Koch Industries
 Estée Lauder – businesswoman and mother of Leonard and Ronald Lauder
 Leonard Lauder – businessman, art collector, and heir of Estée Lauder Companies
 Edgar F. Luckenbach – shipping magnate
 Bernard Madoff – former NASDAQ chairman and convicted felon of various securities fraud
 Ruth Madoff (born 1941) – wife of Bernie Madoff
 Gurnee Munn – President of American Totalisator
 Bud Paxson – founder of Paxson Communications
 Charles Peter McColough – former Chairman and CEO of the Xerox Corporation
Nelson Peltz (born 1942) – billionaire businessman and investor
 Ronald Perelman – corporate raider, Chairman of Revlon who sold his Palm Beach house in 2004 for $70 million
 Jeffry Picower (1942–2009) – investor and philanthropist involved in the Madoff investment scandal
 John Sculley – former CEO of Apple, Inc and former president of PepsiCo
 Christopher A. Sinclair – Chairman and CEO of Mattel and former CEO of Pepsi-Cola

Music
 Jimmy Buffett – singer
 Jon Bon Jovi – singer from New Jersey, who in March 2018 purchased a home on the island, in addition to his other residences in Boca Raton, and New Jersey.
 Vic Damone – singer-songwriter, actor
 Michael Jackson – singer, lived there briefly in 2003 until 2005.
 John Lennon – musician worked with The Beatles. Lennon bought Harold Vanderbilt's former home, El Solano, in 1980 shortly before his murder.
 Rod Stewart – singer
 Butch Trucks – founding member of The Allman Brothers Band

Media
 Roger Ailes – television executive and media consultant
 Conrad Black – former Canadian media baron, author, and convicted fraudster lived on Palm Beach Island for over twenty years
 Curt Gowdy – sportscaster
 Rush Limbaugh – radio show host, and conservative political commentator
 Mehmet Oz – better known as Dr. Oz, Turkish-American cardiothoracic surgeon, professor, author, and television personality.
 Howard Stern – radio personality

Philanthropists
 Mary Duke Biddle – philanthropist and wife of Anthony Joseph Drexel Biddle Jr.
 Joseph Gurwin (1920–2009) – philanthropist
 Evelyn Lauder – co-creator of the Pink Ribbon breast cancer awareness campaign, creator of Clinique
 Nancy Brinker – founder of Susan G. Komen for the Cure
 Janet Annenberg Hooker – philanthropist and daughter of Moses Annenberg
 Marjorie Merriweather Post – Post cereal heiress, socialite, and philanthropist who built Mar-a-Lago. Wife of E.F. Hutton
 Mollie Wilmot – philanthropist and socialite
 Jayne Wrightsman – philanthropist and socialite

Politicians and political families
 Chester C. Bolton – Congressman from Ohio
 Frances P. Bolton – wife of Chester C. Bolton. Served out the remainder of her husband's term after his death and then nearly 30 years thereafter
 Paul Ilyinsky – mayor of Palm Beach
 Kennedy family – political family
 Brian Mulroney – former Canadian Prime Minister
 Henry Paulson – former US Treasury Secretary
 Wilbur Ross – US secretary of Commerce
 Earl E. T. Smith – former United States Ambassador to Cuba and mayor of Palm Beach
 Donald Trump – 45th President of the United States
 Ivana Trump – ex-wife of Donald Trump, until 2016
 Melania Trump – wife of Donald Trump

Sports figures
 Logan Allen – MLB pitcher for the San Diego Padres
 Steve Alvers – American football player
 Herman Barron (1909–1978) – professional golfer
 Rich Barnes – MLB pitcher for the Chicago White Sox and Cleveland Indians
 Kevin Ohme – MLB pitcher for the St. Louis Cardinals
 Lamar Jackson - NFL quarterback for the Baltimore Ravens
 Scottie Barnes - NBA small forward for the Toronto Raptors

Others
 Madeleine Astor – Titanic survivor and widow of John Jacob Astor IV
 Anthony Joseph Drexel Biddle Jr. – United States Ambassador to several countries between the 1930s and 1960s
 Billy Bishop – World War I flying ace, he died while spending the winter of 1956 in Palm Beach
 Henry Morrison Flagler – founder of Palm Beach 
 Robert W. Gottfried – homebuilder
 Paul Tudor Jones – hedge fund manager and philanthropist
 Lana J. Marks – designer
 Addison Mizner – influential architect of Palm Beach landmarks and residences in the 1920s
 Paris Singer – builder of Everglades Club, within which is his apartment
 Harold Vanderbilt – railroad executive, great-grandson of Cornelius Vanderbilt, owned El Solano before John Lennon bought it.
 Vera Wang – fashion designer (has recently sold the $9m mansion she owned on the Palm Beach coast and moved to NYC)
 Joseph E. Widener – founding benefactor of the National Gallery of Art, philanthropist, and horseman

References

Palm Beach
Palm Beach
 
Palm Beach, Florida